The 2014–15 Temple Owls basketball team represented Temple University during the 2014–15 NCAA Division I men's basketball season. The Owls, led by ninth year head coach Fran Dunphy, played their home games at the Liacouras Center and were members the American Athletic Conference. They finished the season 26–11, 13–5 in AAC play to finish in a tie for third place. They advanced to the semifinals of the American Athletic tournament to SMU. They were invited to the National Invitation Tournament where they defeated Bucknell in the first round, George Washington in the second round, and Louisiana Tech in the quarterfinals to advance to the semifinals where they lost to Miami (FL).

Previous season 
The Owls finished the season 9–22, 4–14 in AAC play to finish in a tie for eighth place. They lost in the first round of the AAC tournament to UCF.

Departures

Incoming Transfers

Incoming recruits

Recruiting Class of 2015

Roster

Schedule and results

|-
!colspan=9 style="background:#9E1B34; color:#FFFFFF;"| Regular season

|-
!colspan=9 style="background:#9E1B34; color:#FFFFFF;"| American Athletic Conference tournament

|-
!colspan=9 style="background:#9E1B34; color:#FFFFFF;"| NIT

Awards
Will Cummings was named to the First Team All-AAC. Jaylen Bond was an Honorable Mention All-AAC.

References

Temple Owls men's basketball seasons
Temple
Temple
Temple Owls men's basketball
Temple Owls men's basketball